The Diocese of Sydney, Australia and New Zealand (also Australian and New Zealand Diocese) is the diocese of the Russian Orthodox Church Outside Russia in Australia and New Zealand headquartered in Sydney.

History 

The first Russian Orthodox parish in Australia was St Nicholas Church (now St Nicholas Russian Orthodox Cathedral) founded in 1926 in Brisbane.

The Australian diocese of the ROCOR was founded in 1946 with episcopal see at St Nicholas Church in Brisbane.

In 1950 the episcopal see was moved to Sydney to the Ss Peter and Paul Cathedral.

In 1994 the Korean Orthodox mission was subordinated to Australian and New Zealand diocese by decree of the Synod of Bishops.

In February 2005, the diocese included parishes of Indonesia that are of Old Calendar or independent Churches.

In 2012 a Pakistan mission was established.

Bishops

Diocesan bishops
 Theodore (Rafalsky) (December 12, 1946 - May 5, 1955)
 Sabbas (Raevsky) (1955 - September 5, 1969)
 Athanasius (Martos) (5 September 1969 - 23 July 1970)
 Sabbas (Raevsky) (July 23 - November 25, 1970) locum tenens
 Theodosius (Putilin) (November 25, 1970 - August 13, 1980)
 Paul (Pavlov) (August 1980 – 1992)
 Daniel (Alexandrov) (March 18, 1992 - 1994) locum tenens
 Alypius (Gamanovich) (April 7 - May 1994)
 Barnabas (Prokofiev) (11 January - September 1995)
 Hilarion (Kapral) (June 20, 1996 - 16 May 2022)
 George (Schaefer) (since 17 May 2022)

Vicar bishops

Bishops of Brisbane 
 Athanasius (Martos) (5 September 1950 - 17 October 1953)
 Philaret (Voznesensky) (May 26, 1963 - May 27, 1964)
 Constantine (Essensky) (December 10, 1967 - September 1974)
 Gabriel (Chemodakov) (July 7 - October 6, 1996)

Bishops of Melbourne 
 Athanasius (Martos) (December 22, 1949 - September 5, 1950; October 1953)
 Sabbas (Raevsky) (18 January 1954 - May 1955)
 Anthony (Medvedev) (November 16, 1956 - 1968)
 Theodosius (Putilin) (29 November 1969 - 25 November 1970)

Bishops of Canberra 
 George (Schaefer) (October 7, 2014 - September 21, 2022)

References

External links 
 Official website
 Official website of the Russian Orthodox Church Outside Russia
 History of the Russian Orthodox presence in Australia

Russian Orthodox Church Outside of Russia
Russian-Australian culture
Russian-New Zealand culture
Eastern Orthodoxy in Indonesia
Eastern Orthodox dioceses in Oceania